Edicto Gilbert Morejon (born May 13, 1945) is a Cuban sprint canoer who competed in the early 1970s. At the 1972 Summer Olympics in Munich, he was eliminated in the semifinals of the K-1 1000 m event and the repechages of the K-2 1000 m event.

References
Sports-reference.com profile

1945 births
Canoeists at the 1972 Summer Olympics
Cuban male canoeists
Living people
Olympic canoeists of Cuba